Count  was a Japanese statesman and founder of the Japanese Red Cross Society. His son, Admiral Sano Tsuneha, was a leading figure in the establishment of the Scout Association of Japan.

Biography
Sano was born in Hayatsue, Saga Domain (present-day Saga city, Saga Prefecture) as the fifth son of the low ranking samurai Shimomura Saburōzaemon. In 1831 he was adopted by the physician Sano Tsuneyoshi and was allowed to study at the domain academy Kōdōkan. He accompanied his step-father to Edo in 1837, where he studied Confucianism, but returned to Saga in 1839 to continue his medical education.  In 1846, he was sent by the Nabeshima clan, rulers of Saga, to study rangaku (western learning) in Kyoto under Hirose Genkyō, and subsequently in Osaka under Ogata Kōan. He then returned to Edo in 1849 to study under Itō Gemboku, Totsuka Seikai, and others. In 1851, he returned to Saga to establish his own academy, which received official recognition from Nabeshima Naomasa, the daimyō of Saga in 1853.

Nabeshima Naomasa had a strong interest in western technology and with the opening of the Nagasaki Naval Training Center in 1855. Sano was selected by the domain as one of its first students. The goal of Saga Domain was to build a western-style steam warship, which Sano helped complete in 1865.

Sano accompanied the Japanese delegation to the Paris Exposition of 1867, and while in Paris learned of the International Red Cross.

After the Meiji Restoration, Sano was called upon to assist in the formation of the Imperial Japanese Navy and received a posting at the Ministry of War in 1870. In 1873, he was sent to visit the 1873 Vienna World Exposition, with Alexander von Siebold as his interpreter.  In 1875, he was appointed to the Genrōin.
With the start of the Satsuma Rebellion in 1877, Sano created the Hakuaisha ('Philanthropic Society'), a relief organization to provide medical assistance to wounded soldiers from both sides of the conflict. This idea met with tremendous opposition and incomprehension by many members of the government, but Sano was able to enlist the support of Prince Arisugawa Taruhito, nominal head of the Imperial Japanese Army and Prince Komatsu Akihito. Sano’s organization became the Japanese Red Cross Society in 1887, with Sano as its first president.

Sano also created the Ryuchikai, the forerunner of the Japan Art Association in 1879, in an attempt to stem the outflow of Japanese important cultural properties to overseas collectors.

From 1880-1881, he served in the Ministry of Finance, and in 1882 as president of the Genrōin. In 1886, he helped establish the first Red Cross Hospital in Japan.

In 1887, Sano was recognized for his accomplishments with elevation to the kazoku peerage with the title of viscount (shishaku) and was appointed a member of the Privy Council in 1888. In 1892, during the 1st Matsukata administration, he was appointed as Minister of Agriculture and Commerce.

In 1895, Sano was elevated to the title of count (hakushaku). On his death at his home in Tokyo in 1902, he was posthumously awarded with the Order of the Rising Sun (1st class with Paulownia Blossoms). His grave is at Aoyama Cemetery in Tokyo.

In 1939, the Japanese government issued a series of four commemorative postage stamps honoring the 75th anniversary of the Red Cross Treaty. A portrait of Sano Tsunetami appears on two of the stamps.

References
 Brunton, Richard. Building Japan 1868–1876. RoutledgeCurzon (1995). 
 Checkland, Olive. Japan and Britain after 1859: Creating Cultural Bridges. RoutledgeCurzon (2002). 
 Cobbing, Andrew. The Japanese Discovery of Victorian Britain. RoutledgeCurzon (1989). .
 Yoshikawa, Ryuko. Nisseki no soshisha Sano Tsunetami. Yoshikawa Kobunkan (2001).  (Japanese)
 Asahi, Keiko: Sano Tsunetami - kindai-Kokka no Paionia. In: W. Michel / Y. Torii / M.Kawashima (ed.): No rangaku Kyushu - ekkyō to Koryu. Kyoto: Shinbunkaku Shuppan, 2009 289–296 ( 朝日恵子「佐野常民- -越境と交流」思文閣出版 ). (Japanese)

External links
 Sano Tsunetami Memorial Museum in Saga (Japanese site)

 

1822 births
1902 deaths
People from Saga (city)
Kazoku
People of Meiji-period Japan
Nabeshima retainers
Government ministers of Japan
Grand Cordons of the Order of the Rising Sun
Japanese expatriates in the Netherlands
Rangaku